Peter Zingoni (born April 28, 1981) is an American former professional ice hockey player. He primarily played in the American Hockey League (AHL) during his career. He also spent two seasons playing in Europe in the Finnish SM-liiga and the German Deutsche Eishockey Liga.

Playing career
Zingoni was drafted by the Columbus Blue Jackets in the eighth round, 231st overall, of the 2000 NHL Entry Draft after playing in the EJHL with the New England Jr Coyotes. Zingoni began his career playing collegiate hockey with the Providence College Friars of Hockey East during the 2000–01 season. Following four seasons at the collegiate level, he signed an amateur try-out contract on March 19, 2004 with the Columbus Blue Jackets, and was promptly sent down to play with their AHL affiliate, the Syracuse Crunch. He played his first professional game with them on March 21, 2004. He tallied four points in five games.

After a season in which he played for three different teams in Europe, Zingoni signed a contract with the Trenton Titans of the ECHL on September 26, 2005. Although he did not make his debut until January 13, 2006 due to a groin strain, Zingoni impressed the organization, and on October 16, 2006, he was signed to a professional try-out contract by the Philadelphia Phantoms, the Titans' AHL affiliate.

On November 11, 2006, Zingoni scored the fourth natural hat-trick in the Phantoms history, also scoring his first three points of the season, in a 6–3 victory over the Bridgeport Sound Tigers.

In the 2010–11 season on December 22, 2010, the Houston Aeros called Zingoni up from their ECHL affiliate, the Bakersfield Condors. After only 5 games with the Aeros, Zingoni was mutually released from his contract to join German team, Augsburger Panther of the DEL for the remainder of the season on January 21, 2011.

Career statistics

References

External links

1981 births
American men's ice hockey centers
Augsburger Panther players
Bakersfield Condors (1998–2015) players
Columbus Blue Jackets draft picks
Houston Aeros (1994–2013) players
Living people
Norfolk Admirals players
Lahti Pelicans players
Sportspeople from Bridgeport, Connecticut
Philadelphia Phantoms players
Providence Friars men's ice hockey players
Syracuse Crunch players
HC TPS players
Trenton Titans players
Ice hockey players from Connecticut